Penal military units, including penal battalions, penal companies, etc., are military formations consisting of convicts mobilized for military service. Such formations may contain soldiers convicted of offenses under military law, persons enrolled in the unit after being convicted in civilian courts, or some combination of the two. Service in such units is typically considered a form of punishment or discipline in lieu of imprisonment or capital punishment.

History
One of the earliest examples of penal military units was recorded in the Chinese annals Records of the Grand Historian and Book of Han.  During the Han–Dayuan War, unhappy with the failure of General Li Guangli in an earlier expedition in 104 BC, Emperor Wu of Han promised amnesty and rewards to criminals, prisoners and bandits (赦囚徒捍寇盜) and dispatched a 60,000-strong army consisting of "bad boys" (惡少年) to attack the Greco-Bactrian kingdom of Dayuan in 102 BC.

Dedicated penal units were first envisioned during the Napoleonic era of warfare, as large armies formed of conscripts often suffered from disciplinary problems. Soldiers who refused to face the enemy were seen as detrimental to the cohesion of the army and as a disgrace to the nation. The formation of penal battalions was seen as a way of disciplining an army and keeping soldiers in line. In addition, many nations conscripted criminals into penal battalions in lieu of imprisoning or executing them during wartime to better utilize national manpower. Such military units were treated with little regard by the regular army and were often placed in compromising situations, such as  being used in forlorn hope assaults. The French Empire in particular was notable for employing penal military units during the wars of the coalition, especially during the later years of the conflicts as manpower became limited. The Régiment pénal de l'Île de Ré, formed in 1811 and composed almost entirely of criminals and other societal undesirables, would see action during the later years of the Napoleonic Wars.

The disbandment of conscripted armies and end of large scale warfare following the Napoleonic era led to the decline of the penal battalion system in continental Europe. However, the system continued in overseas colonies, again with the French as the primary employers of penal battalions. The Battalions of Light Infantry of Africa (Bats d'Af) was formed by order of Louis Philippe I in 1832 for the purpose of expanding the French colonial empire. The Battalion fought in the French conquest of Algeria and during the Crimean War. The French also employed the compagnies d'exclus ("companies of the excluded"), military units which were stationed at Aîn-Sefra in Southern Algeria. These penal units consisted of convicts condemned to five years or more of hard labor and were judged unworthy to carry weapons.

The various Italian unification conflicts saw the Redshirts recruiting convicts and revolutionaries from prisons into penal regiments known as Battaglioni degli imprigionati ("Battalions of the Imprisoned" or "Prisoners Battalion".)

The period of military rearmament preceding World War II caused renewed interest in the concept of penal military units. In May 1935 the German Wehrmacht instituted a new policy under German conscription law that stated soldiers who were deemed disruptive to military discipline but were otherwise "worthy of service" would be sent to military penal units. Criminals were also conscripted into penal units in exchange for lighter sentences or as a form of stay of execution. These units, referred to as "special departments" or the generic term Strafbataillon, were overseen by the German military police. Prior to World War II, there were nine Strafbataillone within the Wehrmacht. The primary role of a Strafbataillon was to provide front line support. As the war progressed, the size of Strafbataillon companies dramatically increased in size due to changes in German military policy. Under such policies, any soldier who had a death sentence (for retreat) commuted was automatically reassigned to penal units, greatly increasing the number of soldiers available to the Strafbataillon.

The effectiveness of Strafbataillone were mixed. The combination of criminals, political prisoners, and undisciplined soldiers that made up a Strafbataillon often required harsh measures to be imposed for unit cohesion to be maintained. Strafbataillone were often ordered to undertake high risk missions on the front line, with soldiers being coached to regain their lost honor by fighting. Certain penal military units, such as the 36th Waffen Grenadier Division of the SS, gained a reputation as being brutal towards civilian populations and prisoners of war, and were employed as anti-partisan troops due to the fear they inspired. Other units, most notably the 999th Light Afrika Division, suffered from poor morale and saw soldiers desert the Wehrmacht to join resistance groups.

Following Operation Barbarossa and the entry of the Soviet Union into World War II, the Red Army began to seriously consider the implementation of penal military units. These efforts resulted in the creation of Shtrafbat, penal military units composed of sentenced soldiers, political prisoners, and others deemed to be expendable. A large number of Red Army soldiers who retreated without orders during the initial German invasion were reorganized into rudimentary penal units, the precursors to dedicated Shtrafbat. The Shtrafbat were greatly increased in number by Joseph Stalin in July 1942 via Order No. 227 (Директива Ставки ВГК №227). Order No. 227 was a desperate effort to re-instill discipline after the panicked routs of the first year of combat with Germany. The order—popularized as the "Not one step back!" (Ни шагу назад!, Ni Shagu Nazad!) Order—introduced severe punishments, including summary execution, for unauthorized retreats.

During the Chinese Civil War (the part from 1945 to 1949) the National Revolutionary Army (NRA) was known to have used penal battalions. A unit made up of deserters and those accused of cowardice, the penal battalion was given tasks such as scouting ahead of the main forces to check for ambushes, crossing rivers and torrents to see whether they were fordable, and walking across unmapped minefields.

By country

Belgium
 Woodchopping platoon of the Orne Penal unit for Flemish soldiers acting against the French speaking superiors in the Belgian army during the First World War.

Bolivia
 50th Infantry Regiment (Bolivia) personnel were recruited from prisons and under command from army and police officers in the Chaco war.

Finland
 Erillinen Pataljoona 21 ("Separate Battalion 21") or "Pärmi's Devils" was a penal battalion that fought in the Finnish army during the Continuation War, and was commanded by Major Nikke Pärmi. Er.P 21 was founded in August 1941 from voluntary criminal prisoners, and it also included leftists who were in protective custody. The distinguishing mark of Er.P 21 was the black letter V sewn into the sleeve of the uniform, according to which the unit was nicknamed "Black Arrow".

France
 Régiment pénal de l'Île de Ré, formed in 1811, disbanded in 1814. This was one of five regional penal units forming part of the French Army during this period and disbanded at the First Restoration.
 Battalion of Light Infantry of Africa formed in 1832 and made up of men with prison records who still had to complete their military service, plus serving soldiers with serious disciplinary problems.
 Disciplinary Company of the Foreign Regiments in the Far East (1946–1954)

Italy
 Cacciatori franchi of Regio Esercito 
 Battaglione di rigore of Genio Lavoratori (Italian Social Republic)
 Battaglioni degli imprigionati

Nazi Germany
 Afrika-Brigade 999 (a.k.a. Bewährungseinheiten 999, Strafbataillon 999, Bewährungstruppe 999, Division 999).
 Dirlewanger Brigade (a.k.a. SS-Sturmbrigade Dirlewanger, later 36th Waffen Grenadier Division of the SS). Consisting of hardened criminals who were not expected to survive recruitment, it became notorious even among the Waffen-SS for the sheer depravity of its war crimes.
 Strafbattalion (German Army unit)

Russia
 In July 2022 during the Russian Invasion of Ukraine, the Wagner Group recruited inmates to fight in Ukraine.

South Korea
 Unit 684 of the Republic of Korea Air Force formed from convicts to assassinate North Korean leader Kim Il-sung in 1968.

Soviet Union
 Shtrafbat (NKVD prisoner battalions in World War II)

Ukraine
 In February 2022 during the Russian invasion of Ukraine, Ukraine offered to release prisoners with combat experience if they will fight in the army.

See also
Barrier troops
Galvanized Yankees – American Civil War Confederate prisoners of war who swore allegiance to the Union
The Dirty Dozen - A 1967 movie about a penal military unit formed from convicts for a commando mission
March battalion
Military prison

Notes

References

Conquest, Robert, Kolyma: The Arctic Death Camps, Methuen Press, (1978) 
Hatch, Gardner N., American Ex-prisoners of War: Non Solum Armis, Turner Publishing Company, (1988), 
Krivosheev, G.F. Soviet Casualties and Combat Losses in the twentieth century, London, Greenhill Books, 1997, available online (in Russian) .
Lebed, Alexander (Gen.), My Life and My Country, Regnery Publishing, Inc. (1997) 
Manazeev, Igor, A 'Penal' Corps on the Kalinin Front, Journal of Slavic Military Studies, Vol. 15, Issue 3, September 2002 
Mawdsley, Evan, The Stalin Years: The Soviet Union 1929-1953, Manchester University Press (2003), 
Suvorov, Viktor, Inside The Soviet Army, Hamish Hamilton (1982), 
Tolstoy, Nikolai, Stalin's Secret War, New York: Holt, Rinehart & Winston (1981), 
Toppe, Alfred, Night Combat, Diane Publishing (1998), 
Lynch, Dr Michael, The Chinese Civil War 1945–49: Modern Warfare (Guide To... Book 61) Osprey Publishing (2010),

External links
Yefim Golbraikh memoirs, including his serving commander of a penal company 
Article on Penal Units from Voice of Russia

Law of war
Penal units